Reifezeugnis is a 1977 German television film directed by Wolfgang Petersen and part of the Tatort television series. The film starred Nastassja Kinski in her first major role in a feature-length film, it was her breakthrough role that made her famous in Germany. It was also an important movie for Wolfgang Petersen's career as a director.

Nastassja Kinski plays Sina, a good-looking 17-year-old schoolgirl, who has a secret affair with her married schoolteacher Helmut Fichte. One of Sina's suitors, Michael, learns about her affair and tries to blackmail her. Sina lures him to the forest, kills him with a stone, and tells a clever fabrication to the police. Still, Kommissar Finke doesn't trust her story and continues to investigate until the truth is revealed. At the end, he has to stop Sina from killing herself with a gun. Reifezeugnis is considered to be one of the most legendary films of the Tatort series, also because the depicted affair between Sina and her teacher was a major scandal during that time.

The movie was released theatrically in the United States under the title For Your Love Only in 1982.

Cast 
 Klaus Schwarzkopf as Kommissar Finke, police inspector
 Nastassja Kinski as Sina Wolf
 Christian Quadflieg as Helmut Fichte
 Judy Winter as Gisela Fichte
 Markus Boysen as Michael Harms
 Rüdiger Kirschstein as Franke, Finke's police assistant
 Petra Verena Milchert as Inge
 Rebecca Völz as Katrin
 Uta Sax as Sina's mother
 Henry Kielmann as Sina's father
 Friedrich Schütter as Dr. Forkmann, school director

References

External links
 
 Short Review at The New York Times

Tatort
1977 films
1977 television films
1977 television episodes
German television films
Films directed by Wolfgang Petersen
1970s German-language films
German-language television shows
West German films
Television episodes set in Germany
Television episodes about crime
Drama television episodes
Films about scandalous teacher–student relationships
Das Erste original programming